Sean Thomas Killion (born October 24, 1967) is an American former competition swimmer and Pan American Games gold medalist, who represented the United States at the 1992 Summer Olympics.

Killion was born in Camden, New Jersey, and spent his early years training at Jersey Wahoos, a club located in Mount Laurel, New Jersey. Growing up in Cherry Hill, New Jersey, Killion swam at Cherry Hill High School East, setting New Jersey State Interscholastic Athletic Association records that have stood for as long as 30 years before he graduated in 1986.

He was a surprise gold medalist in the 1986 Goodwill Games, defeating world record and Olympic gold medalist Vladimir Salnikov, outtouching him at the wall.   He claimed the gold medal at the 1991 Pan American Games in the men's 400-meter freestyle event.

Killion represented the United States at the 1992 Summer Olympics in Barcelona, Spain.  He competed in the B Final of the men's 400-meter freestyle, and finished with the eleventh-best overall time of 3:52.76.  He also recorded a time of 15:27.49 in the preliminary heats of the men's 1,500-meter freestyle, but did not advance.

Killion held the American record in the 800-meter freestyle from July 27, 1987 to August 25, 2002.

See also
 List of University of California, Berkeley alumni

References

1967 births
Living people
American male freestyle swimmers
California Golden Bears men's swimmers
Olympic swimmers of the United States
Sportspeople from Camden, New Jersey
Swimmers at the 1991 Pan American Games
Swimmers at the 1992 Summer Olympics
Pan American Games gold medalists for the United States
Pan American Games medalists in swimming
People from Cherry Hill, New Jersey
Cherry Hill High School East alumni
Swimmers from New Jersey
Competitors at the 1986 Goodwill Games
Medalists at the 1991 Pan American Games